Radio 1 is a Belgian radio channel operated by the Flemish public broadcaster Vlaamse Radio- en Televisieomroep (VRT).

The channel focuses on news (with bulletins every half hour), together with discussion and debate on public policy and social issues. Radio 1 also carries live coverage of sporting events, branded "Sporza Radio".

Radio 1's musical content is a mix of contemporary and classic pop and rock music (focusing on Flemish productions), with specialist music programming in the evening schedules.

Logos and identities

Guest programmes
Radio 1 regularly allocates a limited amount of airtime for the transmission of so-called "guest programmes": that is to say, programmes produced by associations and organizations representing faith and other socio-philosophical communities recognized by the Flemish Government as having the right to make such broadcasts. At the present time (February 2014) these are:
 – representing Belgian Judaism
Evangelische Radio en Televisie Omroep – Evangelical Christian broadcaster
Radio Gezinsbond  by the  – defending the interests of the family
Het Vrije Woord by the Humanistisch-Vrijzinnige Vereniging – representing secularism and free thought
Het Braambos by the Katholieke Televisie en Radio Omroep – Catholic broadcasting organization
Moslim Televisie en Radio Omroep – Muslim broadcasting organization
Orthodoxe Kerk in België – the Orthodox Church in Belgium
Protestantse Omroep – Protestant Christian broadcaster

References

External links

  

Dutch-language radio stations in Belgium
Radio stations established in 1930
News and talk radio stations